The Camp Olímpic de Tir amb Arc was a temporary venue located in Barcelona. It hosted the archery competitions for the 1992 Summer Olympics. It was located in a site at the Ronda de Dalt, next to the Pavelló de la Vall d'Hebron, in the Barcelona district of Horta-Guinardó.

After the Olympics, it was remodelled into Ciutat Esportiva Municipal Vall d'Hebron-Teixonera, which consists of two football (soccer) fields, a rugby field and an annexe service area.

References
1992 Summer Olympics official report. Volume 2. pp. 239–41.

Sports venues completed in 1992
Venues of the 1992 Summer Olympics
Olympic archery venues
Defunct sports venues in Catalonia
Sports venues in Barcelona